Sola i Karlstad ("the Sun in Karlstad"), nickname of Eva Lisa Holtz (1 January 1739, Karlstad – 24 September 1818), was a Swedish waitress and innkeeper who became the symbol of the Swedish city of Karlstad.

She worked as a waitress on several of the local inns in Karlstad, and came to be known for her "sunny" disposition, thereby being given the nickname "the Sun in Karlstad".

References
 
 
 
 
 

1739 births
18th-century Swedish businesspeople
19th-century Swedish businesspeople
1818 deaths
19th-century Swedish businesswomen